A Girl Like Me is the debut studio album by English singer Emma Bunton, released on 16 April 2001 by Virgin Records. Following the release of the Spice Girls' third studio album, Forever (2000), the group announced that they were beginning an indefinite hiatus and would be concentrating on their solo careers in regards to their foreseeable future. Recording sessions for Bunton's first solo album took place from July 1999 to October 2000 at several recording studios.

A Girl Like Me debuted and peaked at number four on the UK Albums Chart, selling 21,500 copies in its first week. The album spawned three singles: "What Took You So Long?" (which topped the charts in the United Kingdom and New Zealand), "Take My Breath Away" and "We're Not Gonna Sleep Tonight". The album also features Bunton's collaboration with Tin Tin Out, a cover of "What I Am" by Edie Brickell & New Bohemians. On 7 September 2001, A Girl Like Me was certified gold by the British Phonographic Industry (BPI), denoting shipments in excess of 100,000 copies.

Critical reception

A Girl Like Me garnered a lukewarm reception from music critics, who praised its catchy songs, but were critical of its generic nature.

Deborah J Elliot of Musical Discoveries was positive about the album, calling it a " very nice listen" that showed Bunton "growing out of her pig tails from the days of the Spice Girls, into a grown woman", and singled out the singles as well as the tracks "Better Be Careful", "High on Love", "A World Without You", "Been There, Done That" and "Spell It Out" for praise. Ian Wade of Dotmusic was also positive towards the album: he praised tracks such as the lead single, "Better Be Careful" and "A World Without You", but was critical of the more R&B cuts such "Been There, Done That". In the end, he concluded: "Overall, 'A Girl Like Me', is a thoroughly likeable affair, much like Emma herself, and should put an end to her enforced toddlerism Baby years once and for all". Stewart Mason of AllMusic felt that Bunton's singing voice lacked depth but that it worked with the well-crafted and addictive pop songs, concluding that it "isn't an album for the ages, but it's better than 'not bad.'" Timothy Park of NME gave the album a 6/10 rating. He said that there were great tracks such as "Take My Breath Away" and "We're Not Gonna Sleep Tonight" that Bunton performs adequately, but concluded that "A Girl Like Me, like Emma, is very sweet but, like Emma also, it has no balls." Erik Missio of Chart Attack said he saw promise in the album but felt disappointed by its attempts to resemble the Spice Girls' sound. Stephen Robinson of Hot Press criticised the tracks for being overly sweet and borrowing from other genres but being unoriginal with them, calling it "another album to chuck aboard the pop blandwagon."

In a retrospective article about the Spice Girls' solo and group discography, Quentin Harrison of Albumism wrote: "A Girl Like Me'''s natural air of ease and comfort in its expression of its musical identity establishes that Bunton has an unpretentious awareness of herself as a singer and writer. Her knowledge of her strengths allows her to forgo any major missteps and has let her initiating effort age impeccably thus far"

Track listing

Notes
  signifies an additional producer

Personnel
Credits adapted from the liner notes of A Girl Like Me''.

Musicians

 Emma Bunton – vocals
 Ash Howes – programming 
 Steve Mac – arrangement 
 Ulf Forsberg – string concertmaster 
 Henrik Janson – string arrangements, string conducting 
 Ulf Janson – string arrangements, string conducting 
 Simon Hale – string arrangements ; brass arrangements 
 StoneBridge – keyboards 
 Andrew Frampton – arrangement, string arrangements 
 Chris Braide – arrangement 
 Nick Ingman – string arrangements 
 Lawrence Johnson – additional vocal arrangement 
 Rhett Lawrence – arrangement, programming, guitar 
 Ramón Stagnaro – guitar

Technical

 Richard "Biff" Stannard – production 
 Julian Gallagher – production 
 Ash Howes – recording ; mixing ; engineering 
 Alvin Sweeney – additional recording, Pro Tools ; additional engineering 
 Mark "Spike" Stent – mixing 
 Jan "Stan" Kybert – mix engineering, Pro Tools 
 Matt Fields – mixing assistance 
 Steve Mac – production, mixing 
 Chris Laws – engineering 
 Evan Rogers – production 
 Carl Sturken – production 
 Al Hemberger – engineering 
 Mick Guzauski – mixing 
 Tom Bender – mixing assistance 
 Stefan Boman – string engineering 
 StoneBridge – additional production, mixing 
 Andrew Frampton – production 
 Daniel Frampton – engineering 
 Brad Gilderman – mixing 
 Steve Price – string recording 
 Tin Tin Out – production, mixing 
 Rhett Lawrence – production, recording engineering, mixing 
 Jason Bonilla – recording engineering 
 Will Catterson – recording engineering 
 Evan Lloyd – engineering assistance 
 Dave "Hard Drive" Pensado – mixing 
 Dylan "3D" Dresdow – mixing

Artwork
 Terry Richardson – photography
 Ian Ross – design
 Ruth Rowland – lettering

Charts

Weekly charts

Year-end charts

Certifications

Release history

Notes

References

2001 debut albums
Albums produced by Carl Sturken and Evan Rogers
Albums produced by Richard Stannard (songwriter)
Albums produced by Steve Mac
Albums recorded at Olympic Sound Studios
Albums recorded at Polar Studios
Emma Bunton albums
Virgin Records albums